An artificial metalloenzyme (ArM) is a metalloprotein made in the laboratory which cannot be found in the nature and can catalyze certain desired chemical reactions. Despite fitting into classical enzyme categories, ArMs also have potential in chemical reactivity like catalyzing Suzuki coupling, metathesis and so on, which are never reported in natural enzymatic reaction. With the progress in organometallic synthesis and protein engineering, more and more new kind of design of ArMs came out, showing promising future in both academia and industrial aspects.

In 2018, one half of the Nobel Prize in Chemistry was awarded to Frances H. Arnold “for the directed evolution of enzymes”, which elegantly evolved the artificial metalloenzymes to realize efficient and highly selective abiotic chemical reaction in vitro and in vivo.

Origin
Dated back to 1956, the first protein modified transition metal catalyst was documented. The Palladium(II) salt was absorbed onto silk fibroin fiber, reduced by hydrogen to get the first reported ArM, which can catalyze asymmetric hydrogenation.
First attempt to anchor an abiotic metal center onto a protein was reported by Whitesides using biotin-avidin interaction, making an artificial hydrogenase. The presence of avidin can significantly increase the catalytic capacity of Rhodium(I) cofactor in aqueous phosphate buffer.

Formation

Abiotic cofactor anchoring
There are four main types of making to localize the artificial metal cofactor to make an ArM, including covalent, supramolecular, metal substitution and dative.

Covalent 
With the development of bioconjugation technology, there are plenty of options to covalently ligating an artificial metal cofactor onto a protein: i) cysteine residue based chemistry like: Cys-meleimide, Cys-α-haloketone, Cys-benzylhalide chemistry and disulfide formation, ii) post-translational bioorthogonal modification based on Amber suppression (e.g., Click chemistry) and iii) enzyme active site modification (e.g., covalent bond formation between lipase and lipase inhibitor).

The video shows an example using reaction between cysteine residue and α-haloketone to introduce a phenanthroline ligand into an adipocyte lipid binding protein. In this context, the ArM can selectively hydrolyze certain racemic esters.

Supramolecular 
Avidin and biotinylated artificial metal cofactor the most commonly used supramolecular strategy to make an ArM. In the example showed below, the ligand of Ru(I) complex was modified with biotin and than the whole complex was loaded onto streptavidin by biotin-avidin interaction. The resulted ArM can catalyze the reduction of prochiral ketones. Taking advantages of protein context, different mutants of strepavidin can achieve different stereochemistry selectivity by direct evolution. For example, Mutant L124V can selectively reduce certain ketone into R-alcohol while S112A-K121N can reduce the same substance into S-alcohol.
Besides biotin-avidin based ArMs, another important attempt utilizing supuramolecular interaction is antigen-antibody recognition. First reported in 1989 by Lerner, a monoclonal antibody-based ArM is raised to hydrolyze specific peptide.

Metal substitution 
Natural metal ion cofactor center was substituted by non-native metal to achieve unique reactivity.

Dative 
The dative anchoring strategy uses natural amino acid residue in the protein like His, Cys, Glu, Asp and Ser to coordinate to a metal center. Like the first example of Pd-fibroin, dative anchoring is not commonly used now and often resulted in a more ambiguous binding site for metal compared with previous three methods.

Protein backbone and Evolution 
In addition to anchoring artificial metal center on a protein, researchers like Frances Arnold also focused on changing the native environment of natural metal cofactor. Due to the protein context in which the metal catalytic center located, ArMs have a large sequence space to evolve to meet different demands on substance specificity and regio- and enantioselectivity. Directed evolution was used to tailor the catalytic capacity and repurpose the enzyme function. Mostly based on native porphyrin-metal cofactor, Arnold's lab has developed many ArMs has unique ArMs to catalyze regioselective and/or enantioselective Carbon-Boron bond formation, carbene insertion, and aminohydroxylation by evolving the sequence context of the corresponding ArMs.

Function

An evolvable aqueous asymmetric catalysts 
As a catalyst, ArMs have three advantages,

 thanks to the development in molecular biology, it is quite easy to generate a library of ArM mutants which has a size up to 108. Using proper selection method, the ArM has a large potential to gain unique catalytic properties. 
 ArMs are proteins, it can have both hydrophilic and hydrophobic surface in the aqueous solution. Anchoring the artificial cofactor which is not easily dissolve in water would help it function in aqueous phase. In some structure, the hydrophobic cavity would protect some labile bond (like many carbene or nitrene-metal complex in Arnold ArMs). 
 The backbone itself in ArM is a asymmetric environment. In some cases, the enantioselective synthesis can be tuned by changing one or two amino acid residues around the metal catalytic center.

So far, ArMs can catalyze a lot of chemical reactions, such as: allylic alkylation, allylic amination, aldol reaction, alcohol oxidation, C-H activation, click reaction, catechol oxidation,  reduction, cyclopropanation, Diels-Alder reaction, epoxidation, epoxide ring opening, Friedel-Crafts alkylation, hydrogenation, hydroformylation, Heck reaction, metathesis, Michael addition, nitrite reduction, NO reduction, Suzuki reaction, Si-H insertion, polymerization (atom transfer radical polymerization).

References 

Metalloproteins
Medicinal inorganic chemistry